USS LST-984 was an   in the United States Navy. Like many of her class, she was not named and is properly referred to by her hull designation.

LST-984 was laid down on 3 January 1944 at the Boston Navy Yard; launched on 25 February 1944; sponsored by Mrs. Charles J. Donahue; and commissioned on 1 April 1944.

Service history
LST-984 apparently did not see combat service during World War II.

Following World War II, LST-984 performed occupation duty in the Far East until mid-March 1946. She was decommissioned on 25 June 1946 and struck from the Navy list on 31 July that same year. On 19 June 1948, the ship was sold to the Humble Oil & Refining Co., of Houston, Texas, for operation.

References

 

LST-542-class tank landing ships
World War II amphibious warfare vessels of the United States
Ships built in Boston
1944 ships